Matías Fracchia Moreira (born 21 September 1995) is a professional footballer who plays as a defender for Liga Nacional club Comunicaciones. Born in Chile, he has represented both the United States and Uruguay at under-20 level.

Club career

Fracchia played college soccer for North Carolina State University.

For 2019, he signed for Chilean second division side Deportes Vallenar after failing to make an appearance for Deportes Temuco and Barnechea in the lower leagues.

For 2020, he signed for O'Higgins in the Chilean top flight.

International career
Fracchia holds three different citizenships: Chilean by his birth, Uruguayan by his paternal line and American by residence. So, he has represented Uruguay as well as the United States at youth level.

Personal life
He is the son of the former Uruguayan international footballer Marcelo Fracchia.

References

External links
 

1995 births
Living people
Footballers from Santiago
Chilean people of Uruguayan descent
Chilean footballers
Chilean expatriate footballers
People with acquired Uruguayan citizenship
Uruguayan footballers
Uruguayan expatriate footballers
Uruguay under-20 international footballers
Naturalized citizens of the United States
United States men's under-20 international soccer players
Primera B de Chile players
Segunda División Profesional de Chile players
Chilean Primera División players
A.C. Barnechea footballers
Deportes Vallenar footballers
O'Higgins F.C. footballers
Uruguayan Primera División players
Montevideo Wanderers F.C. players
Liga Nacional de Fútbol de Guatemala players
Comunicaciones F.C. players
Chilean expatriate sportspeople in the United States
Chilean expatriate sportspeople in Guatemala
Uruguayan expatriate sportspeople in Guatemala
Expatriate soccer players in the United States
Expatriate footballers in Guatemala
Association football defenders